Banyeres del Penedès is a village in the province of Tarragona and autonomous community of Catalonia, Spain.

See also
No Fem el CIM

References

External links
 Government data pages 

Municipalities in Baix Penedès